Lyndhurst is a former railway station on the South Gippsland (now Cranbourne) line. In 1979, it had a single platform on the east side of the track, and a loop siding.

The station was served by passenger trains to Leongatha and Yarram until their withdrawal in June 1981, and then by Dandenong to Lang Lang railmotors until their withdrawal in October 1981. Although passenger trains between Melbourne and Leongatha were restored between 1984 and 1993, Lyndhurst station was not re-opened. The platform has been demolished.

In the 1969 Melbourne Transportation Plan, a new passenger line was proposed linking Frankston and Lyndhurst.

Cement traffic from Waurn Ponds near Geelong, to a siding serving a concrete batching plant operated by Boral, ended in 2009, after Pacific National increased the costs charged to Blue Circle Southern. The siding and the silo were removed in 2021 to make way for the duplication of the Cranbourne line.

References

Disused railway stations in Melbourne
Rail freight terminals in Victoria (Australia)